Zain South Sudan is a mobile communications and information technology services provider in South Sudan. Zain South Sudan is a subsidiary of the Zain Group, a telecommunications multinational, active in eight middle eastern and north African countries, serving an estimated 48.3 million customers, as of 30 June 2021.

Zain South Sudan is the second-largest telecommunications network company in the country, with an estimated 1,050,000 customers as of 31 December 2020, behind market leader and sole competitor at that time, MTN South Sudan, who has 1.7 million customers. Zain South Sudan's market share was 38.2 percent, as of December 2020.

Location
The headquarters of Zain South Sudan are located along Mundri Road, Haya Jabal, Gudele, in the city of Juba, the capital of South Sudan. The coordinates of the headquarters are 4°52'07.0"N, 31°32'24.0"E (Latitude:4.868611; Longitude:31.540000).

Overview 
With  customer base of about 1.05 million, as of 31 December 2020, Zain South Sudan commanded a market share of 38.2 percent against its only competitor at that time, MTN South Sudan, with 1.7 million subscribers and a 61.8 percent market share. At that time, the population of South Sudan was estimated at 11 million people.

Governance
The chief executive officer of Zain South Sudan is Basel Manasrah, effective January 2013.

History

As part of the 2005 Naivasha Agreement between the Khartoum central government and the Sudan People's Liberation Army/Movement (SPLA/M), a referendum should take place after five years in the Southern Sudan region, to determine whether the region should remain as part of Sudan or become independent. On 7 February 2011, the referendum results show the majority voting in favour of independence.

As a result, of the referendum, which shows Southern Sudan's succession from Sudan, Zain Sudan has to split its operation into two separate independent networks. It was the first time in the history of the telecom industry worldwide for a network to split its operations.

A proposal for the network separation which covered 90% of the populated areas was prepared in January 2011. The objective was to build an independent network from Sudan with the most advanced Billing and VAS systems. This was completed before September 1, the date marked for the separation. The network separation was completed immediately after the independence of South Sudan and Zain South Sudan became operational.

Thanks to the early and careful planning, the network was established with the world's most advanced 3G technology and covered South Sudan's largest cities including Juba, Wau, Aweil, and Malakal. The network was also extended to other populated cities and SIM Cards were changed to bear the new name, Zain-South Sudan (Zain SS).

Zain South Sudan was the first company to use the new numbers after migration to the new country code (+211) together with the new Zain-South Sudan SIM Cards in the newly born nation. Additionally, roaming subscribers in South Sudan were able to use the Zain-South Sudan network at a time when other networks were facing difficulties in accommodating roaming subscribers.

See also
 List of mobile network operators in South Sudan

References

Further reading

External links 
Zain corporation

 Internet disrupted, streets quiet in South Sudan after call for protests As of 30 August 2021.

Telecommunications companies established in 2011
Mobile phone companies of South Sudan
2011 establishments in South Sudan
Telecommunications companies of South Sudan